The 2014 President's Cup was the inaugural President's Cup. The match was played between 2013 League of Ireland Premier Division champions, St Patrick's Athletic, and 2013 FAI Cup Final winners Sligo Rovers at Richmond Park on  2 March 2014. The match finished 1–0 to St Patrick's Athletic, with Keith Fahey scoring with a right-footed volley top the top right corner from 25 yards after 18 minutes.

Match

See also
 2014 FAI Cup
 2014 League of Ireland
 2014 League of Ireland Cup
 2014 Setanta Sports Cup

References

President of Ireland's Cup
President Of Ireland's Cup
President Of Ireland's Cup 2014
President Of Ireland's Cup 2014